These are the official results of the Women's 1500 metres event at the 1999 IAAF World Championships in Seville, Spain. There were a total number of 29 participating athletes, with two qualifying heats and the final held on Sunday 29 August 1999 at 20:10h.

Medalists

Heats
Held on Friday 27 August 1999

Final

References
 IAAF
 todor66

H
1500 metres at the World Athletics Championships
1999 in women's athletics